Ibarapa North is a Local Government Area in Oyo State, Nigeria. It was created in 1996 from old Ifeloju L.G. Its headquarters are in the town of Ayete. Other notable towns in the LG are Tapa and Igangan. Each of the towns has quite a number of villages. The current chairman is Lateef Adebayo Lawal (PDP).

The major markets within the LG include Ajise, Obada, Alaagbaa, Alabi, Konko, Oja-Isale etc.

It has an area of 1,218 km and a population of 101,092 at the 2006 census, consisting of the Ibarapa people, a yoruba sub-ethnic grouping.

The postal code of the area is 201.

References

Local Government Areas in Oyo State